The ANBO VIII was a Lithuanian bomber-reconnaissance monoplane designed by Antanas Gustaitis and built by Karo Aviacijos Tiekimo Skyrius.

Design and development
The ANBO VIII was a low-wing monoplane with a tailwheel landing gear, an enclosed two-seat tandem cockpit and powered by a  Bristol Pegasus XVIII radial engine. The prototype and only ANBO VIII was first flown on 5 September 1939 and was still under testing when the country was annexed by the Soviet Union. The prototype was removed by the Soviet authorities for testing.

Operators

Specifications

References

External links

Virgin flight of Anbo VIII

1930s Lithuanian bomber aircraft
8
Single-engined tractor aircraft
Low-wing aircraft
Aircraft first flown in 1939